is a Japanese manga artist, know for his works Kyō Kara Ore Wa!! (1988–1997) and Cheeky Angel (1999–2003). The latest won the 46th Shogakukan Manga Award in the shōnen category in 2001.

Works

Manga

Serialized
 (1989–1997) — Serialized in Shogakukan's Shōnen Sunday Zōkan and Weekly Shōnen Sunday.
 (1990) — Serialized in Shogakukan's Weekly Shōnen Sunday.
 (1998–1999) — Serialized in Shogakukan's Weekly Shōnen Sunday.
 (1999–2003) — Serialized in Shogakukan's Weekly Shōnen Sunday. – Published in English by Viz Media.
 (2004–2006) — Serialized in Shogakukan's Weekly Shōnen Sunday.
 (2007–2009) — Serialized in Shogakukan's Weekly Shōnen Sunday.
 (2010–2012) — Serialized in Shogakukan's Weekly Shōnen Sunday.
 (2016–2017) — Serialized in Shogakukan's Weekly Shōnen Sunday.
 (2018–2019) — Serialized in Shogakukan's Shōnen Sunday S.
 (2020–present) — Serialized in Shogakukan's Shōnen Sunday S.

Other
 (1987) — One-shot debut, published in Shogakukan's Shōnen Sunday Zōkan.
 (1990) — One-shot published in Shogakukan's Weekly Young Sunday.
 (2006–2007) – Five chapters irregularly serialized in Shogakukan's Weekly Young Sunday.
 (2010) — Two chapters published in Shogakukan's Monthly Shōnen Sunday and discontinued.
 (2019) — Collection of Nishimori's nine one-shot stories, including: Pū Tarō; Tsuppari Shakainideru; ; ; ; The A-kos five chapters; ; ; and Super CHARGER.

Novels
 (2012) — Adapted into a manga series by Yuuki Iinuma, serialized in Shogakukan's Monthly Sunday Gene-X (2018–2019)
 (2014)

Notes

References

External links
  
  
 

Living people
1963 births
Manga artists from Chiba Prefecture